Dichomeris griseola is a moth in the family Gelechiidae. It was described by Anthonie Johannes Theodorus Janse in 1960. It is found in South Africa.

References

Moths described in 1960
griseola